Macroglossinae can refer to two unrelated subfamilies of animals:

Macroglossinae (Chiroptera), a type of megabat
Macroglossinae (moth), a type of sphinx moth